Canadian Aero Service Ltd v O'Malley, [1974] SCR 592, is a leading civil case decided by the Supreme Court of Canada on corporate director and officer liability.

Facts
Canadian Aero Service Ltd. ("Canaero") was a company whose main business was topographical mapping and geophysical exploration. O'Malley and Zarzycki were senior officers of Canaero, and, together with Wells, were directors of the company. After the acquisition of Canaero's parent by Litton Industries in 1961, Wells resigned as director in February 1965. O'Malley and Zarzycki resigned from their positions in August 1966. Wells was aware the latter were discontented at Canaero by reason of the limitations upon their authority and the scope of independent action imposed by the Litton company, and they also feared loss of position if Canaero should fail to get contracts.

Prior to their resignation, at the suggestion of Wells, the three decided to form a business venture in the same fields as Canaero. It was incorporated as Terra Surveys Limited in September 1966. In that month, Terra was chosen to receive a contract to perform a topographical survey and related mapping for the government of Guyana, and the agreement was executed in November 1966. The proposal upon which the contract was granted was based on preparatory work that had been performed by O'Malley and Zarzycki for Canaero prior to their resignations.

Canaero filed a claim against the three (together with Terra) on the basis that the defendants had improperly taken the fruits of a corporate opportunity in which Canaero had a prior and continuing interest.

The issues

 the determination of the relationship of O'Malley and Zarzycki to Canaero
 the duty or duties, if any, owed by them to Canaero by reason of the ascertained relationship
 whether there has been any breach of duty, if any is owing, by reason of the conduct of O'Malley and Zarzycki in acting through Terra to secure the contract for the Guyana project
 the question of liability for breach of duty if established

The judgments below
In the Supreme Court of Ontario, it was held that, while O'Malley and Zarzycki, as corporate officers, had fiduciary obligations to Canaero, such obligations did not apply in this case. As the trial judge (Grant J) said,

The judgment was affirmed on appeal to the Court of Appeal for Ontario, but it was held O'Malley and Zarzycki did not have fiduciary obligations to Canaero. Instead, the relationship was simply that of employees and employer, involving no corresponding fiduciary obligations and, apart from valid contractual restriction, no limitation upon post-employment competition save as to appropriation of trade secrets and enticement of customers.

Decision of the Supreme Court of Canada
Appeal was allowed for all but one of the defendants.

The Court held that anyone in a supervisory or controlling role of a company has a fiduciary duty towards the company which includes the duties of "loyalty, good faith and avoidance of a conflict of duty and self-interest".

As the court noted,

Significance
The case significantly extended the reach of fiduciary duties that had been previously recognized in Canadian law by Peso Silver Mines Ltd v Cropper, which had adopted the principles of Regal (Hastings) Ltd v Gulliver. These principles have been furthered in subsequent cases, most notably in Peoples Department Stores Inc (Trustee of) v Wise.

Aero Service and Peso Silver Mines continue to illustrate the boundaries of conflict of interest that directors of Canadian companies must keep in mind in their deliberations.

References

External links

Supreme Court of Canada cases
1973 in Canadian case law
Canadian corporate case law